Ysgol Gyfun Gymraeg Plasmawr is a Welsh-medium comprehensive secondary school in Cardiff. It opened in September 1998 as the second school of its kind in Cardiff. Its buildings had formerly belonged to Waterhall Secondary Modern School and more recently formed Ysgol Gyfun Gymraeg Glantaf's Lower School. The current headteacher is Dr Rhodri Thomas.

Catchment area and demography 
The school serves a wide area of western Cardiff that includes Culverhouse Cross, Ely, Caerau, Grangetown, Butetown, Riverside (including Pontcanna), Canton, Fairwater (including Pentrebane), Llandaff, Radyr, Creigiau, Pentyrch,  and Gwaelod-y-Garth.

In 2010 it was noted that 75% of the pupils come from homes where English is the predominant language, with 22% coming from homes whose main language was Welsh. In 2013 9% of the pupils were recorded as having an ethnic background other than 'White-British'.

Notable former pupils 
Ben Cabango Professional footballer for Swansea City A.F.C and Wales international
Catrin Stewart Welsh actress

Teaching awards 
Two of the school's teachers have been awarded Teaching Awards.  Mrs Meinir Rees became the Wales SEN Teacher of the Year in 2005, and later that year became the UK SEN Teacher of the Year.  The following year, Mr Geraint Rees became the Wales Secondary Headteacher of the Year and was runner up for the UK version of the Award.

References

External links
http://www.estyn.gov.uk/inspection_reports/Plasmawr.pdf 2003 inspection (pdf file)
http://www.estyn.gov.uk/download/publication/149522.1/inspection-reportysgol-gyfun-gymraeg-plasmawreng2010/ 2009 inspection (pdf file)

Secondary schools in Cardiff
Educational institutions established in 1998
Welsh-language schools
1998 establishments in Wales